This page covers all the important events in the sport of tennis in 2017. Primarily, it provides the results of notable tournaments throughout the year on both the ATP and WTA Tours, the Davis Cup, and the Fed Cup.

ITF

Grand Slam events

Davis Cup

Fed Cup

Important events

Other tennis events
 September 22–24: 2017 Laver Cup in  Prague
  Team Europe defeated  Team World, 15–9, to win their first Laver Cup title.

Number-1-ranked players

Men's singles

Female singles

Men's doubles

Female doubles

Beach tennis

Continental and world events
 July 10: 2017 ITF Beach Tennis World Team Championship in  Moscow
 In the final,  defeated , 2–0.  took third place and  fourth place.
 August 1–6: World Championships in  Cervia
 Men's doubles:  Michele Cappelletti & Luca Carli 
 Women's doubles:  Federica Bacchetta & Giulia Gasparri
 October 8–10: 2017 ITF European Championships in  Sozopol

ITF Beach Tennis Tour (only prize money)

Europe
 January 6–8: #1 in  Monopoli
 Men's doubles:  Faccini Marco & Niccolò Strano
 Women's doubles:  Sofia Cimatti & Flaminia Daina
 February 18 & 19 #2 in  Nijmegen
 Men's doubles:  Ioannis Dimopoulos &  Massimo Mattei
 Women's doubles:  Katarína Páleníková &  Natascia Sciolti
 February 18 & 19: #3 in  San Lazzaro di Savena
 Men's doubles:  Michele Cappelletti & Luca Carli
 Women's doubles:  Sofia Cimatti & Flaminia Daina
 April 22 & 23: #4 in  Cervia
 Men's doubles:  Mikael Alessi & Alessio Chiodioni
 Women's doubles:  Michela Romani & Noemi Romani
 April 29 & 30: #5 in  Larnaca
 Men's doubles:  Gregorio Barison & Diego Bollettinari
 Women's doubles:  Ekaterina Glazkova & Anna Romanova
 April 30 & May 1: #6 in  Lido degli Estensi #1
 Men's doubles:  Nicolò Appiotti & Francesco Pesaresi
 Women's doubles:  Federica Bacchetta & Giulia Gasparri
 May 20 & 21: #7 in  Póvoa de Varzim
 Men's doubles:  Gerard Rodriguez &  Thibaut François
 Women's doubles:  Omayra Farías & Silvia Arroyo
 May 26–28: #8 in  Lignano Sabbiadoro
 Men's doubles:  Luca Cramarossa & Marco Garavini
 Women's doubles:  Sofia Cimatti & Flaminia Daina
 May 27 & 28: #9 in  Jurmala
 Men's doubles:  Gerard Rodriguez &  Ioannis Dimopoulos
 Women's doubles:  Anelle Luik &  Dorothee Berreth
 June 3 & 4: #10 in  Lido degli Estensi #2
 Men's doubles:  Diego Bollettinari & Matteo Marighella
 Women's doubles:  Sofia Cimatti & Flaminia Daina
 June 3: #11 in  Viljandi
 Men's doubles:  Ainar Laube & Priit Pihl
 Women's doubles:  Anelle Luik &  Anna Svaronoka
 June 4 & 5: #12 in  La Flèche
 Men's doubles:  Jérôme Maillot & Jean Nouaux
 Women's doubles:  Pauline Bourdet & Catherine Henuzet
 June 10 & 11: #13 in  Liepaja
 Men's doubles:  Nikolay Guryev &  Ioannis Dimopoulos
 Women's doubles:  Liudmila Nikoyan &  Irina Kuzmina-Rimša
 June 10 & 11: #14 in  Furiani
 Men's doubles:  Patricio Pallara & Davide Fontana
 Women's doubles:  Giorgia Gilardi & Elisa Cappelli
 June 17 & 18: #15 in  Sillery
 Men's doubles:  Benjamin Gros & Jean Nouaux
 Women's doubles:  Magali Garnier &  Natascia Sciolti
 June 17 & 18: #16 in  Ravenna
 Men's doubles:  Luca Cramarossa & Marco Garavini
 Women's doubles:  Federica Bacchetta & Giulia Gasparri
 June 18: #17 in  Ingelheim am Rhein
 Men's doubles:  Benjamin Ringlstetter & Manuel Ringlstetter
 Women's doubles:  Nadja Leuenberger & Sarah Leuenberger
 June 24 & 25: #18 in  Montauban
 Men's doubles:  Régis Courtois &  Simone Burini
 Women's doubles:  Elisa Cappelli & Giorgia Gilardi
 July 1 & 2: #18 in  Rhodes
 Men's doubles:  Andrea Stuto & Simone Burini
 Women's doubles:  Alessia Angelini & Natascia Sciolti
 July 1 & 2: #19 in  Fregene
 Men's doubles:  Doriano Beccaccioli & Davide Benussi
 Women's doubles:  Veronica Casadei & Nicole Nobile
 July 7–9: #20 in  Kazan
 Men's doubles:  Luca Cramarossa & Marco Garavini
 Women's doubles:  Sofia Cimatti & Flaminia Daina
 July 15–16: #21 in  Alba Adriatica
 Men's doubles:  Tommaso Giovannini & Luca Meliconi
 Women's doubles:  Maddalena Cini & Greta Giusti
 July 21 & 23: #22 in  Ugento
 Men's doubles:  Alessandro Calbucci & Marco Garavini
 Women's doubles:  Sofia Cimatti & Flaminia Daina
 July 22 & 23: #23 in  Preddvor
 Men's doubles:  Alessandro Taccaliti & Mattia Spoto
 Women's doubles:  Katarína Páleniková &  Giulia Curzi
 July 22 & 23: #24 in  Samara
 Men's doubles:  Nikolay Guryev & Andrey Kozbinov
 Women's doubles:  Ekaterina Kamenetckaia & Regina Livanova
 July 22 & 23: #25 in  Angoulême
 Men's doubles:  Igor Panin &  Gerard Rodriguez-Querol
 Women's doubles:  Catherine Henuzet & Capucine Rousseau
 July 28–30: #26 in  Frontignan
 Men's doubles:  Gregorio Barison & Diego Bolletinari
 Women's doubles:  Dorothee Berreth &  Julie Labrit
 July 29 & 30: #27 in  Torre del Lago
 Men's doubles:  Luca Cramarossa & Marco Garavini
 Women's doubles:  Sofia Cimatti & Flaminia Daina
 August 5 & 6: #28 in  Faro
 Men's doubles:  Pedro Maio & Henrique Freitas
 Women's doubles:  Manuela Cunha & Ana Catarina Alexandrino
 August 6: #29 in  Dąbrowa Górnicza
 Men's doubles:  Uroš Brinovec &  Daniel Kahr
 Women's doubles:  Aniko Kovacs & Monika Erdelyi
 August 19 & 20: #24 in  Ahlbeck

Africa
 February 17 & 18: #1 in  Marsa Alam
 Men's doubles:  Yves Fornasier &  Alexander Bailer
 Women's doubles:  Laura Galli &  Manuela Cunha
 March 11 & 12: #2 in  Saint-Pierre
 Men's doubles:  Romain Say & Philippe Vadel
 Women's doubles:  Marie-Eve Hoarau & Mathilde Hoarau
 March 17–19: #3 in  Saint-Gilles #1
 Men's doubles:  Michele Cappelletti & Luca Carli
 Women's doubles:  Federica Bacchetta & Giulia Gasparri
 March 18 & 19: #4 in  Dahab
 Men's doubles:  Georgios Karavasilis &  Oliver Munz
 Women's doubles:  Daria Churakova & Angelina Gordienko
 April 15 & 16: #5 in  Casablanca #1
 Men's doubles:  Massimo Mattei & Dennis Valmori
 April 22 & 23: #6 in  Las Palmas
 Men's doubles:  Luca Cramarossa & Marco Garavini
 Women's doubles:  Flaminia Daina & Sofia Cimatti
 April 23 & 24: #7 in  Cairo
 Men's doubles:  Ioannis Dimopulos & Giorgos Martinis
 Women's doubles:  Anastasia Kokkinou & Evaggelia Tsavou
 May 7 & 8: #8 in  L'Étang-Salé
 Men's doubles:  Mathieu Guegano & Ugo Quilici
 Women's doubles:  Julia Coll & Elodie Vadel
 May 15 & 16: #9 in  Casablanca #2
 Men's doubles:  Marco Scudellari & Stefano Casadei
 Women's doubles:  Angelina Gordienko & Yulia Chubarova
 May 20 & 21: #10 in  Casablanca #3
 Men's doubles:  Marco Scudellari & Stefano Casadei
 Women's doubles:  Sarah Benabdeljalil & Camilia Benabdeljalil
 May 27 & 28: #11 in  Saint-Gilles #2
 Men's doubles:  Frédéric Pamard & Théo Irigaray
 Women's doubles:  Mathilde Hoareau & Marie-Eve Hoarau
 July 29 & 30: #12 in  Tanger
 Men's doubles:  Adil Medina &  Javeir Mendez
 Women's doubles:  Camilia Benabdeljalil & Sarah Benabdeljalil

Asia
 April 1 & 2: #1 in  Fujisawa #1
 Men's doubles:  Yusuke Hiraki & Susumu Kawashima
 Women's doubles:  Eri Homma & Akiko Otani
 May 20 & 21: #2 in  Miura
 Men's doubles:  Keita Iseki & Naoaki Yamamoto
 Women's doubles:  Misa Miyasaka & Tomomi Takahashi
 May 27 & 28: #3 in  Fujisawa #2
 Men's doubles:  Susumu Nakajima & Naoaki Yamamoto 
 Women's doubles:  Eri Homma & Akiko Otani
 July 1 & 2: #4 in  Fujisawa #3
 Men's doubles:  Daisuke Tsuruoka & Naoaki Yamamoto
 Women's doubles:  Eri Homma & Akiko Otani
 August 19 & 20: #5 in  Fukuoka

Central America
 April 8 & 9: #1 in  Orient Bay
 Men's doubles:  Mathieu Porry & Raphael Porry
 Women's doubles:  Maraike Biglmaier &  Patricia Diaz
 April 14–16: #2 in  Le Moule
 Men's doubles:  Nikita Burmakin &  Tommaso Giovannini
 Women's doubles:  Maraike Biglmaier &  Patricia Diaz
 April 21–23: #3 in  Le Carbet
 Men's doubles:  Nikita Burmakin &  Tommaso Giovannini
 Women's doubles:  Maraike Biglmaier &  Patricia Diaz
 May 26–28: #4 in  Carolina
 Men's doubles:  Carlos Rivera &  Carlos Vigon
 Women's doubles:  Lady Correa &  Marie-Pier Huet
 June 3–5: #5 in  Schœlcher
 Men's doubles:  Nicholas Giannotti & Maxence Tournebize
 Women's doubles:  Julie Labrit &  Alizé Ayassamy

South America
 March 3–5: #1 in  Salinas
 Men's doubles:  Alessandro Calbucci & Michele Cappelletti
 Women's doubles:  Sofia Cimatti & Flaminia Daina
 April 15 & 16: #2 in  Maitencillo
 Men's doubles:  Vicente Brusadelli & Juan Pablo Ramirez
 Women's doubles:  Jessica Orselli & Belen Tejeda
 April 29 & 30: #3 in  João Pessoa
 Men's doubles:  Ralff Abreu & Diogo Carneiro
 Women's doubles:  Joana Cortez & Rafaella Miiller
 May 6 & 7: #4 in  Niterói
 Men's doubles:  Luca Cramarossa & Marco Garavini
 Women's doubles:  Joana Cortez & Rafaella Miiller
 May 13 & 14: #5 in  Balneário Camboriú
 Men's doubles:  Ralff Abreu & Diogo Carneiro
 Women's doubles:  Nathalia Font & Flávia Muniz
 May 20 & 21: #6 in  Maceió
 Men's doubles:  Ralff Abreu & Diogo Carneiro
 Women's doubles:  Joana Cortez & Rafaella Miiller
 July 1 & 2: #7 in  São Miguel do Gostoso
 Men's doubles:  Ralff Abreu & Diogo Carneiro
 Women's doubles:  Marilia Câmara & Lorena Melo
 August 4–6: #8 in  Fortaleza
 Men's doubles:  Allan Oliveira & Adolfo Januário
 Women's doubles:  Flávia Muniz & Marilia Câmara

International Tennis Hall of Fame
Class of 2017:
Kim Clijsters, player
Monique Kalkman-Van Den Bosch, player
Andy Roddick, player
Vic Braden, contributor
Steve Flink, contributor

References

External links
Official website of the Association of Tennis Professionals (ATP)
Official website of the Women's Tennis Association (WTA)
Official website of the International Tennis Federation (ITF)
Official website of the International Team Competition in Men's Tennis (Davis Cup)
Official website of the International Team Competition in Women's Tennis (Fed Cup)

 
Tennis by year